Pepper Ann is an American animated television series created by Sue Rose and aired on Disney's One Saturday Morning on ABC. It first premiered on September 13, 1997, and ended on November 18, 2000. Pepper Ann was the first Disney animated television series to be created by a woman.

Tom Warburton, who later created Cartoon Network's Codename: Kids Next Door, served as the lead character designer for the series.

Overview
Pepper Ann centers on the trials and tribulations that occur during the titular character's adolescence and charts her ups and downs at Hazelnut Middle School. The character originated in a comic strip published in YM magazine.

Episodes

Characters

Main
 Pepper Ann Pearson (voiced by Kathleen Wilhoite): The titular protagonist of the series, who is a bespectacled, 12-year-old girl whose emotions come out in fantasies. She is of Jewish faith from her mother's side (as stated in the holiday-themed episode).
 Nicky Anais Little (voiced by Clea Lewis): Pepper Ann's blonde-haired best friend, who is a soft-spoken, over-achiever. 
 Milo Kamalani (voiced by Danny Cooksey): Pepper Ann's other best friend, who is a laid-back artist. He is the only non-white main character of the series.
 Lydia Pearson (voiced by April Winchell): Mother of Pepper Ann and Moose.
 Margaret Rose "Moose" Pearson (voiced by Pamela Adlon): Pepper Ann's younger 7-year-old sister.

Recurring
 Principal Hickey (voiced by Don Adams): The class' tough disciplinarian with zero-tolerance for Pepper Ann's shenanigans.
 Janie Lilly Diggety (voiced by Susan Tolsky): Pepper Ann and Moose's aunt and Lydia's sister, who served in the Peace Corps. 
 JoJo Diggety (voiced by Tino Insana): Pepper Ann and Moose's uncle and Janie's husband, who works as a cop.
 Trinket St. Blair (voiced by Jenna von Oÿ): A spoiled, rich, popular girl.
 Dieter Lederhosen (voiced by Jeff Bennett): A exchange student from Germany.
 Cissy Rooney (voiced by Kath Soucie): An airheaded popular girl who is Trinket's best friend.
 Tessa & Vanessa James (voiced by Cree Summer): Two gossipy black twin sisters who finish each other's sentences.
 Peter "Pink-Eye Pete" Oglevee (voiced by Jeff Bennett): A nerdy kid who suffers from pink eye.
 Craig Bean (voiced by Jeff Bennett): The "cool" 8th grader and Pepper Ann's love interest.
 Alice Kane (voiced by Lauren Tom): Pepper Ann's nerdy rival.
 Gwen Mezzrow (voiced by Kimmy Robertson): A bubbly girl who constantly alternates between being Milo's love interest and stalker.

Broadcast and home media
Pepper Ann was aired as part of the Disney's One Saturday Morning block on ABC from 1997 to 2001. Reruns were also shown on Disney's One Too on UPN during the 2000–01 season, and later on Disney Channel, and on Toon Disney until 2008.

All 65 episodes of the series were released on Disney+ on September 8, 2021, with the episodes from seasons 4-5 listed under season 3 on the platform and most of the season 5's episode segments that are in mismatched order.

Notes

References

External links 

 

1990s American animated television series
1990s American school television series
1990s American teen sitcoms
1997 American television series debuts
2000s American animated television series
2000s American school television series
2000s American teen sitcoms
2000 American television series endings
ABC Kids (TV programming block)
American Broadcasting Company original programming
American animated sitcoms
American children's animated comedy television series
Animated television series about children
Disney Channel original programming
Disney's One Too
English-language television shows
Middle school television series
Teen animated television series
Television series by Disney Television Animation
Television series created by Sue Rose
UPN original programming
Fictional middle school students